Toxomerus jussiaeae is a species in the family Syrphidae ("syrphid flies"), in the order Diptera ("flies").

References

Further reading

External links

Syrphinae
Diptera of North America
Insects described in 1939